The Simpsonville Christian Church is a historic church on US 60 in Simpsonville, Kentucky.  It was built in 1875 and added to the National Register of Historic Places in 1988.

It is believed to have been built on the site of a former slave market.

See also
Simpsonville Methodist Church, also NRHP-listed

References

National Register of Historic Places in Shelby County, Kentucky
Gothic Revival church buildings in Kentucky
Churches completed in 1875
19th-century Protestant churches
Churches in Shelby County, Kentucky
Churches on the National Register of Historic Places in Kentucky
1875 establishments in Kentucky